Greg Thomas Olley (born 2 February 1996) is an English professional footballer who plays as an attacking midfielder for  club Gateshead.

Club career
Olley signed for Hull City in 2015 after being released by Newcastle United at the end of the 2014–15 season. He made his first-team debut for Hull on 23 August 2016, playing the full 90 minutes in a 3–1 EFL Cup victory over Exeter City. He was released by Hull at the end of the 2017–18 season.

Gateshead
Olley signed for National League club Gateshead on 15 July 2018 on a one-year contract. Olley, like the majority of Gateshead's players and staff, did not have his contract renewed at the end of the season due to financial issues. However, he signed a new one-year contract with the club on 5 July 2019.

Olley was awarded the National League North's Player of the Month award for January 2022 as his side sat top of the league.

Career statistics

References

External links
Profile at the Gateshead F.C. website

1996 births
Living people
Sportspeople from Durham, England
Footballers from County Durham
English footballers
Association football midfielders
Hull City A.F.C. players
Gateshead F.C. players
National League (English football) players